Howland High School is a public high school in Howland Township, Ohio, United States, near Warren, Ohio. It is the only high school in the Howland Local School District. Sports teams are called the Tigers, and they compete in the Ohio High School Athletic Association as a member of the All-American Conference.

Speech and debate
Howland High School's Speech & Debate team won OHSSL State Championships in the 2008-2009 and 2010-2011 seasons.

Athletics
The Howland High School athletic teams compete in the All-American Conference in the OHSAA.

In 2019, the Howland Boys soccer team lost 1-0 in the OHSAA Division 2 State championship game and finished the season as state runners-up.

On November 14, 2020, the Howland Boys soccer team returned to the state championship game. They won the game 5-0 over Tipp City to earn the school's first boys soccer state championship.

Ohio High School Athletic Association State Championships

 Boys Soccer – 2020

Notable alumni
 Willie Davenport, 1968 Olympic gold medalist, 110m hurdles
 Tony Davis, former Penn State and CFL football player
 Filip Filipović, former NFL player
 Larry Savage, former CFL player
 Tanner Scott, MLB pitcher for the Baltimore Orioles
 De'Veon Smith, former Michigan running back and 2017 UDFA signed by the Miami Dolphins
 Chris Zylka, actor

References

External links
 Howland High School website
 District website

High schools in Trumbull County, Ohio
Public high schools in Ohio
1949 establishments in Ohio
Educational institutions established in 1949